Cristian Gonzalo Torres (born 24 December 1999) is an Argentine professional footballer who plays as a winger for Central Córdoba SdE, on loan from Lanús.

Career
Torres came through the youth system at All Boys. He terminated his contract with them in August 2019 after paying $10,000 for his pass, with the winger soon joining Lanús on a free transfer. After a season in their academy, Torres made the move into their first-team squad in November 2020 by making his senior debut in the Copa de la Liga Profesional away to Boca Juniors on 20 November; after replacing Lautaro Acosta after seventy-nine minutes of a 2–1 win at La Bombonera. He made six, three as a starter, further appearances, which included a Copa Sudamericana bow against Bolívar on 2 December.

In February 2021, Torres was loaned to Primera Nacional side Defensores de Belgrano until the end of the year. He debuted in a 4–2 win over Almirante Brown in the Copa Argentina on 19 February. In June 2022, Torres completed a move to Central Córdoba SdE.

Career statistics
.

Notes

References

External links

1999 births
Living people
People from Morón Partido
Argentine footballers
Association football forwards
Argentine Primera División players
Club Atlético Lanús footballers
Defensores de Belgrano footballers
Central Córdoba de Santiago del Estero footballers
Sportspeople from Buenos Aires Province